Allegra Poljak (born 5 February 1999) is a Serbian professional footballer who plays as a winger and a forward for Spanish Primera División club Real Sociedad and the Serbia women's national team.

Club career
Allegra started her career in hometown club Spartak Subotica in Serbia. After playing 4 seasons at the top league, Poljak left for the Hungarian Champions Ferencvárosi TC where she spent 2 seasons playing 32 games and scoring 27 goals. Poljak joined Spanish side UDG Tenerife in 2019 and played there until June 2021. 
Currently she plays for Real Sociedad.

International career
Poljak was an under-19 international for Serbia. and made her debut for the Senior national team of Serbia in 2015, at the age of 16. She has represented Serbia 10 times, scoring 3 goals.

International goals
Scores and results list Serbia's goal tally first.

References

External links

 

1999 births
Living people
Women's association football forwards
Serbian women's footballers
Footballers from Novi Sad
Serbia women's international footballers
ŽFK Spartak Subotica players
Ferencvárosi TC (women) footballers
UD Granadilla Tenerife players
Serbian expatriate women's footballers
Serbian expatriate sportspeople in Hungary
Expatriate women's footballers in Hungary
Serbian expatriate sportspeople in Spain
Expatriate women's footballers in Spain